The École supérieure des arts et techniques de la mode, or ESMOD, is a French private school of fashion. It was founded in Paris in 1841 by Alexis Lavigne. It has branches in Bordeaux, Lyon, Paris, Rennes and Roubaix in France, and in a number of cities in other countries, including Seoul, Moscow, Dubai, and Tokyo

Accreditation

ESMOD is authorised by the Commission nationale de la certification professionnelle, the French national commission for vocational certification, to award a five-year professional certification as fashion stylist/designer at level 6 of the European Qualifications Framework.

Alumni

Alumni of the school include Reem Acra, Franck Sorbier, Olivier Rousteing and Seo Eunkyo. Simon Porte Jacquemus of Jacquemus also attended for a short time.

References

Fashion schools
Educational institutions established in 1841
French fashion